Abdul-Gafar Olatokumbo Ayodeji Lamar "Deji" Karim (born November 18, 1986) is a former American football running back. He was drafted by the Jacksonville Jaguars in the 2010 NFL Draft. He played college football for Southern Illinois and Northeastern Oklahoma A&M College.

High School career
Karim attended Putnam City North High School in Oklahoma City where he was teammates with Arizona Cardinals quarterback Sam Bradford. He earned all state honors his senior year after he rushed for more than 2,000 yards and scored 28 TDs as a senior.  He was not offered a scholarship although he did have interest from schools such as Colorado State, Kansas State, SMU, and Oklahoma State.

College career
Karim played two seasons (2005, 2006) at Northeastern Oklahoma A&M College. In those two seasons he rushed for 1,972 yards on 328 carries with 25 touchdowns. He also had 25 receptions for 315 yards and a receiving touchdown.

Karim then transferred to Southern Illinois. He led the Salukis in 2007 with eight rushing touchdowns, but missed the 2008 season with a knee injury. The 2009 season brought him national recognition as he led the Football Championship Subdivision with 1,694 rushing yards and guided Southern Illinois to the No. 1 national ranking for three weeks, its second-straight Missouri Valley Football Conference Championship and the Elite Eight of the FCS Playoffs. Karim broke the SIU single-season record for all-purpose yards (2,339) and averaged 30.9 yards on 14 kickoff returns with one touchdown. He was named a first-team All-American by four different services and was the MVFC Offensive Player of the Year. Karim finished third in the voting for the 2009 Walter Payton Award (awarded annually to the most outstanding offensive player in the Division I Football Championship Subdivision).

He finished his career at Southern Illinois with 2,080 rushing yards, 26 rushing touchdowns, 10 career 100-yard rushing games and averaged 6.58 yards per carry. Karim only fumbled once in 351 career touches.

Professional career

NFL draft

Jacksonville Jaguars
He was drafted by the Jacksonville Jaguars with the 180th overall pick in the sixth round of the 2010 NFL Draft.

In July 2010, Karim signed a 4-year $1.9 million deal with the Jaguars. During the 2010 season, Karim was used primarily as a returner and was the Jaguars 3rd running back on the depth chart. Karim had 50 kick returns and averaged 25 yards per return. On limited carries he produced 160 Yards during his rookie season.

On April 27, 2012, Karim was released by the Jaguars.

Indianapolis Colts
On April 30, 2012, Karim was claimed off waivers by the Indianapolis Colts. On December 30, 2012, Karim returned a kick off 101 yards for a touchdown against the Houston Texans.

Houston Texans
On May 15, 2013, Karim signed with the Houston Texans. On September 1, 2013, Karim was cut from the final roster of the Texans. On October 28, 2013  Karim signed with Houston Texans once again due to an injuries to Arian Foster and Ben Tate.

Return to Indianapolis
On August 17, 2014, Karim agreed to terms with the Indianapolis Colts. He was placed on injured reserve on August 26 with an undisclosed injury.  On September 2, 2014, he was released by the Colts with an injury settlement.

Professional statistics

References

External links
Jacksonville Jaguars bio
SIU Salukis bio

1986 births
Living people
American football running backs
Houston Texans players
Indianapolis Colts players
Jacksonville Jaguars players
Northeastern Oklahoma A&M Golden Norsemen football players
Players of American football from Oklahoma
Southern Illinois Salukis football players
Sportspeople from Oklahoma City